Soutak is a 2014 album by Sahrawi singer Aziza Brahim, and her first album for Glitterbeat Records.

The album was recorded in Barcelona during June 2013. The producer of the album was Chris Eckman (Walkabouts, Ben Zabo, Tamikrest, Dirtmusic). The musicians on the album are Aziza Brahim (voice, tabal, rhythm guitar), Guillem Aguilar (bass), Kalilou Sangare (acoustic lead guitar), Nico Roca (percussion) and Badra Abdallahe (backing vocals).

Reception
Soutak has topped the World Music Charts Europe (WMCE) for three months consecutively (March, April and May 2014), and stayed six months in the WMCE Top 20.

Track listing

References

2014 albums
Aziza Brahim albums
Glitterhouse Records albums